There have been three Kittybrewster railway stations at Kittybrewster, Aberdeen. This was replaced two years later by a station on a new line to a city terminus at Waterloo. It was replaced again when the Denburn Valley Line to Aberdeen Joint opened in 1867.

The Great North of Scotland Railway amalgamated with other railways to form the London and North Eastern Railway in 1923 and  became part of British Railways when the railways were nationalised in 1948. The station was recommended for closure by Dr Beeching's report "The Reshaping of British Railways" and closed on 6 May 1968. The line remains open as the Aberdeen to Inverness Line.

Stations

Aberdeen Kittybrewster

The station had a single platform, with a loop clear of the platform to allow the locomotive to run round the carriages and push them into the station.

On 23 September, the third day after opening to passengers, a collision between two trains at Kittybrewster resulted in the death of a passenger and several serious injuries. The inquiry found that the driver, attempting to make up time after a late start, had over-run previous stations and been approaching the terminus with excessive speed. The driver attempted to select reverse gear to slow the train but had failed to hold on to the lever, which slipped into forward, propelling the train into carriages waiting on the platform. The station staff should not have allowed the carriages to be waiting at the station. The layout at Kittybrewster was altered after the accident.

Waterloo
The GNoSR sought and obtained powers for a  branch that followed the Aberdeenshire Canal from Kittybrewster to a terminus at Waterloo in the docks.

Joint Station
Kittybrewster was again rebuilt with double line railway to a new joint station in Aberdeen. The station and new line opened on 4 November 1867, the stations at Waterloo and Guild Street closing to passengers and becoming goods terminals.

In 1923 the Great North of Scotland Railway amalgamated with other railways to form the London and North Eastern Railway. This was nationalised in 1948, and services provided by British Railways. The station was recommended for closure by Dr Beeching's in his report "The Reshaping of British Railways" and closed on 6 May 1968.

Locomotive works
The Great North's locomotive works were at Kittybrewster until 1902, when they moved to Inverurie Locomotive Works.

Services
Initially the service was three passenger and one goods train a day, which was increased to five trains a day in 1855 after the GNoSR extended to Keith. This was later reduced to four, until 1858 when the Highland Railway reached Keith, and the service was five trains a day to Keith, with connections or with through carriages on Highland Railway trains to Inverness. This was supplemented by three or four services a day after the Formartine and Buchan Railway opened in 1865 and Peterhead and Fraserburgh were provided with through services from Aberdeen.

In 1887 the service between Aberdeen and Dyce was improved as the number of local trains increased and new stations were opened; by the end of the year there were twelve trains a day, and this eventually became twenty trains a day that took twenty minutes to call at nine stops. As it was Queen Victoria's Golden Jublilee, the trains were initially called the Jubiliees, but became known as the Subbies. However, by the 1930s these services had been losing money for some time as a result of competition from the local buses, and from 5 April 1937 the local services between Aberdeen and Dyce were withdrawn and most of the intermediate stations closed.

The services in summer 1948 included
14 trains per day (tpd) to 
4 tpd to  via 
There were no Sunday services.

References

Footnotes

Sources

Further reading

External links
History of the GNSR Great North of Scotland Railway Association
Great North of Scotland Railway RAILSCOT

Former Great North of Scotland Railway stations
Disused railway stations in Aberdeen
Railway stations in Great Britain opened in 1854
Railway stations in Great Britain closed in 1968
Beeching closures in Scotland
1854 establishments in Scotland
1968 disestablishments in Scotland